John McGinty may refer to:
 John J. McGinty III, United States Marine Corps officer and Medal of Honor recipient
 John Edward McGinty, American securities analyst and investment banker